Micromyrtus prochytes is a plant species of the family Myrtaceae endemic to Western Australia.

The shrub is found in an area in the Mid West region of Western Australia between Geraldton and Yalgoo.

References

prochytes
Endemic flora of Western Australia
Myrtales of Australia
Rosids of Western Australia
Plants described in 2010
Taxa named by Barbara Lynette Rye